Jana Juricová (born 8 December 1987) is a Slovak tennis player.

Juricová was born in Piešťany. She won one singles and two doubles titles on the ITF tour in her career. On 17 September 2007, she reached her best singles ranking of world number 253. On 16 July 2007, she peaked at world number 503 in the doubles rankings.

Juricová has a 1–0 record for Slovakia in Fed Cup competition.

College
While at California, she won the Honda Sports Award as the nation's best female tennis player in 2011.

ITF finals (3–3)

Singles (1–3)

Doubles (2–0)

Fed Cup participation

Doubles

References

External links 
 
 
 

1987 births
Living people
Sportspeople from Piešťany
Slovak female tennis players
California Golden Bears women's tennis players
21st-century Slovak women